Double Happiness is a Chinese drama serial on MediaCorp Channel 8 in Singapore which was screened in 2004 and ended in Jan 2005. It stars Ivy Lee , Xie Shaoguang , Edmund Chen , Vivian Lai & Zhang Wei as the casts of this series. It consists two parts, with 70 episodes in this part of the show. It is about a family who sells fish and chips in a renowned restaurant in East Coast Road called Happy Fish. The restaurant has its ups and downs, but eventually it will come out strong, but not without tragedies and lessons learnt.

In 2007 MediaCorp sold its rights to Chinese broadcaster CCTV8 and it was broadcast in China in 5 parts. It also had a rerun on Channel 8 in August 2012 to March 2013 for both seasons. The latest rerun was in Jan 2020 to Sep 2020 on weekends 7.30am.

Cast
Ivy Lee as Situ Yaxi, Jiaqi's wife, Mrs Luo and Kaijin's   daughter in law, Jiaxi, Jiayu and Jialong's sister in law, Jiafu and Jiaqian's second sister in law, Wenwen, Lana and Patrick's second aunt
Xie Shaoguang as Luo Jialong, Jiaxi, Jiayu, Jiaqi, Jiaqian and Jiafu's big brother, Yaxi's brother in law and Meili's husband 
Patricia Mok as Su Meili,  Jialong's wife, Jiayu, Jiaqi, Jiaqian, Jiafu and Jiaxi's big sister in law
Xiang Yun as Luo Jiaxi, Jialong first younger sister, Xuezhi's wife, Wenwen's mother 
Huang Yiliang as Lin Xuezhi, Jiaxi's husband, Wenwen's father, Jialong first younger brother-in-law, Jiayu, Jiaqi, Jiaqian and Jiafu's first big brother-in-law
Li Xianmin as Lin Wenwen, Jiaxi and Xuezhi's daughter
Aileen Tan as Luo Jiayu
Rayson Tan as Huang Yaozu, Jiayu's husband
Kimberly Wang as Lana, Yaozu and Jiayu's daughter
Clarence Neo Jia Jun as Patrick, Yaozu and Jiayu's son
Vivian Lai as Luo Jiaqian
Edmund Chen as Luo Jiaqi
Alan Tern as Wenjie/Wenxiong (Dual Role)
Priscelia Chan as Lin Meijiao, later Shirley
Jin Yinji as Mrs. Luo/Ah Feng (Dual Role)
Zhang Wei as Luo Kaijin
Hong Huifang as Luo Kaiyin, Kaijin's younger sister
Henry Thia as Gao Ah Peng, Meijiao's former husband
Jeff Wang as Luo Jiafu
Chen Tianwen as William
San Yow as Tang Jiaming

Guest cast
Moses Lim
Brandon Wong

Synopsis
The main female character in the show is Yaxi, who has to struggle with the Luo family for the control of Happy Fish, a Fish and Chips Restaurant. Yaxi, who is married to the Luos' second son Jiaqi, is a career woman who had hardly frequents a kitchen and is asked to look after Happy Fish by her dying mother-in-law.

Accolades

Edmund Chen and Ivy Lee (as Luo Jiaqi and Situ Yaxi respectively) were named the Top 5 Favourite On-screen Partners/Couple at the Star Awards 2007 special celebrating 25 years of Chinese drama.

See also
List of programmes broadcast by Mediacorp Channel 8
 Double Happiness II

References

External links
Official Website (English)
Official Website (Chinese)

Singapore Chinese dramas
2004 Singaporean television series debuts
2005 Singaporean television series endings
2000s Singaporean television series
2004 Singaporean television seasons
Channel 8 (Singapore) original programming